Eupithecia subextremata is a moth in the family Geometridae. It is found in Libya.

References

Moths described in 1959
subextremata
Moths of Africa